Jeongja-dong (정자동) is a neighbourhood in the Bundang-gu district of Seongnam, Gyeonggi-do, South Korea. It is a very wealthy and relatively new neighbourhood, particularly on the western bank of the Tancheon. As recently as 2004, a view of this portion of Jeongja from the northern neighbouring Sunae-dong revealed primarily cranes and buildings under construction. By 2006, most of this construction was completed and several upscale businesses and affluent citizens had moved into the neighbourhood. The plaza between the Paragon apartments, I-Park apartments, and Santeview Apartments is particularly known for its Western-style cafes, and has been used for the filming of both television commercials, dramas, and magazine advertisements. Other residential flats include Adena Palace, Adena Luce, Parkview, Pavilion and Time Bridge. Head office of Naver Corporation and Korea Telecom and Bundang Police Station are also situated in Jeongja-dong.

References

Bundang
Neighbourhoods in South Korea